The 36th Annual Daytime Emmy Awards were held on Sunday, August 30, 2009, at the Orpheum Theatre, Los Angeles, California, and were televised live on The CW for the first time. The Daytime Entertainment Creative Arts Emmy Awards were presented a day earlier on August 29 at the Westin Bonaventure Hotel.

The televised ceremony was hosted by Vanessa L. Williams, and directed by Jeff Margolis and Debbie Palacio. The nominations were announced on May 14, 2009, partially on The Today Show.

Nominations and winners
The following is a partial list of nominees, with winners in bold:

{| class="wikitable sortable"
|-
!scope="col"  style="width:20%;"|Category
!scope="col" style="width:27%;"| Winners and nominees
|-
!scope="row" style="width=50%| Outstanding Drama Series
| 
All My Children
The Bold and the Beautiful
Days of Our Lives
|-
!scope="row" style="width=50%| Outstanding Lead Actor in a Drama Series
| 
Daniel Cosgrove (Bill Lewis, Guiding Light)
Anthony Geary (Luke Spencer, General Hospital)
Thorsten Kaye (Zach Slater, All My Children)
Christian LeBlanc (Michael Baldwin, The Young and the Restless)
Peter Reckell (Bo Brady, Days of Our Lives)
|-
!scope="row" style="width=50%| Outstanding Lead Actress in a Drama Series
| 
Jeanne Cooper (Katherine Chancellor, The Young and the Restless)
Susan Flannery (Stephanie Forrester, The Bold and the Beautiful)
Susan Haskell (Marty Saybrooke, One Life to Live)
Debbi Morgan (Angie Hubbard, All My Children)
Maura West (Carly Snyder, As the World Turns)
|-
!scope="row" style="width=50%| Outstanding Supporting Actor in a Drama Series
| 
Bradford Anderson (Damian Spinelli, General Hospital)
Jeff Branson (Shayne Lewis, Guiding Light)
Van Hansis (Luke Snyder, As the World Turns)
Vincent Irizarry (David Hayward, All My Children)
Jacob Young (JR Chandler, All My Children)
|-
!scope="row" style="width=50%| Outstanding Supporting Actress in a Drama Series
| 
Tamara Braun (Ava Vitali, Days of Our Lives)
Melissa Claire Egan (Annie Lavery, All My Children)
Alicia Minshew (Kendall Hart, All My Children)
Julie Pinson (Janet Ciccone Snyder, As the World Turns)
Bree Williamson (Jessica Brennan, One Life to Live)
|-
!scope="row" style="width=50%| Outstanding Younger Actor in a Drama Series
| 
Blake Berris (Nick Fallon, Days of Our Lives)
E.J. Bonilla (Rafe Rivera, Guiding Light)
Darin Brooks (Max Brady, Days of Our Lives)
Bryton McClure (Devon Hamilton, The Young and the Restless)
Cornelius Smith Jr. (Frankie Hubbard, All My Children)
|-
!scope="row" style="width=50%| Outstanding Younger Actress in a Drama Series
| 
Julie Marie Berman (Lulu Spencer, General Hospital)
Meredith Hagner (Liberty Ciccone, As the World Turns)
Rachel Melvin (Chelsea Brady, Days of Our Lives)
Emily O'Brien (Jana Fisher, The Young and the Restless)
Kirsten Storms (Maxie Jones, General Hospital)
|-
!scope="row" style="width=50%| Outstanding Drama Series Writing Team
| 
All My Children
The Bold and the Beautiful
General Hospital
One Life to Live
|-
!scope="row" style="width=50%| Outstanding Drama Series Directing Team
| 
All My Children
Days of Our Lives
One Life to Live
|-
!scope="row" style="width=50%| Outstanding Talk Show Entertainment
| 
Live with Regis and Kelly
Rachael Ray
The Ellen DeGeneres Show
|-
!scope="row" style="width=50%| Outstanding Talk Show Informative
| 
Dr. Phil
The Doctors
The Tyra Banks Show
|-
!scope="row" style="width=50%| Outstanding Talk Show Host
| 
Regis Philbin and Kelly Ripa on Live with Regis and Kelly
Rachael Ray on Rachael Ray
Barbara Walters, Whoopi Goldberg, Joy Behar, Elisabeth Hasselbeck, and Sherri Shepherd on The View
Ellen DeGeneres on The Ellen DeGeneres Show
|-
!scope="row" style="width=50%| Outstanding Legal/Courtroom Program
| 
 Cristina's Court (syndicated)
 Family Court with Judge Penny (syndicated)
 Judge Hatchett (syndicated)
 Judge Judy (syndicated)
 The People's Court (syndicated)
|-
!scope="row" style="width=50%| Outstanding Morning Program
| 
 Good Morning America (ABC) The Early Show (CBS)
 The Today Show (NBC)
|-
!scope="row" style="width=50%| Outstanding Children's Animated Program
| 
The Backyardigans
Curious George
Little Einsteins
Sid the Science KidWord World
|-
!scope="row" style="width=50%| Outstanding Game/Audience Participation Show
| 
 Cash Cab (Discovery) Jeopardy! (syndicated)
 Who Wants to Be a Millionaire
|-
!scope="row" style="width=50%| Outstanding Game Show Host
| 
 Ben Bailey, Cash Cab (Discovery)
 Howie Mandel, Deal or No Deal (NBC)
 Alex Trebek, Jeopardy! (syndicated)
 Meredith Vieira, Who Wants to Be a Millionaire (syndicated)|-
!scope="row" style="width=50%|Outstanding Sound Editing - Live Action and Animation
| 
Robert Hargreaves and George Brooks (Ben 10: Alien Force)Jake Allston and Michael Petak (Tak and the Power of Juju)
Thomas Syslo, Timothy J. Borquez, Mark Keatts, Mike Garcia, Mark Keefer, Kelly Ann Foley, Keith Dickens, Tony Orozco, Erik Foreman and Eric Freeman (The Batman)
Ryan Araki, Simon Berry, Julia Dalzell and Peter Thillaye (The Future Is Wild)
Jeffrey Lesser, Dan Mennella, Steven Rebollido, Dick Maitland, Chris Sassano (Wonder Pets)
|-
!scope="row" style="width=50%| Outstanding Sound Mixing - Live Action and Animation
| 
Robert Hargreaves, Robert Serda and John Hegedes (Ben 10: Alien Force)
Doug Andham, Eric Freeman and Timothy Borquez (The Batman)
Ray Leonard and Michael Beiriger (My Friends Tigger & Pooh)
Joel Spector and Kristian Pedregon (From the Top at Carnegie Hall) 
John Hegedes and Robert Hargreaves (Legion of Super Heroes)
|-
!scope="row" style="width=50%| Outstanding Directing in an Animated Program
| 
Jeff McGrath, Scott Heming, Cathy Malkasian and Susan Blu (Curious George)
Don MacKinnon, David Hartman and Ginny McSwain (My Friends Tigger & Pooh)
Dave Thomas, Gabe Swarr and Andrea Romano (El Tigre: The Adventures of Manny Rivera)
Mike Fallows (The Future Is Wild)
David SanAngelo (WordGirl)
|-
!scope="row" style="width=50%|Outstanding Individual Achievement in Animation
| 
Eddie Trigueros (El Tigre: The Adventures of Manny Rivera)
Gerald de Jesus (El Tigre: The Adventures of Manny Rivera)
Larry Murphy (The Mighty B!)
Jorge Gutierrez (El Tigre: The Adventures of Manny Rivera)
|-
!scope="row" style="width=50%|Outstanding Special Class Animated Program
|
Steve Oedekerk, Jed Spingarn, Paul Marshal, Margaret M. Dean and Kyle Jolly (Back at the Barnyard)
Brian A. Miller, Sam Register, Glen Murakami, Jennifer Pelphrey and Donna Smith (Ben 10: Alien Force)
Richard Gitelson, Roger Bollen, Marilyn Sadler, Scott Dyer, Pamela Lehn, Jocelyn Hamilton and Jane Sobol (Handy Manny)
|-
|}

Lifetime achievement award
 Sesame StreetSpecial TributesGuiding LightDaytime Gives Back, Feed The Children''

List of Presenters

Notes

 
A first-place tie was recorded in this category.

References

External links

National Academy of Television Arts and Sciences website 

Award shows by Associated Television International
036
Daytime Emmy Awards
Daytime Emmy
Television shows directed by Jeff Margolis